Ankara City Hospital is a  full-service city hospital located in Ankara, Turkey. Opened in 2019, it is the biggest in the country having a total of 3,704 hospital beds.

History
Financing of the hospital in amount of 890 million was provided by eight domestic and foreign banks. Groundbreaking took place with a ceremony held on 18 September 2013. Construction began in 2015. It was built in public–private partnership (PPP). Parts of the hospital went into service in October 2018. It was officially opened on 14 March 2019. It is the second city hospital in Ankara after Etlik City Hospital.

Characteristics
The city hospital is located at Bilkent quarter in Çankaya district of Ankara.

It has 131 operating rooms, 904 polyclinics and 3,704 hospital beds in 82 rooms for VIP, 1,554 single bed rooms, 725 double bed rooms and 700 intensive care units. The dialysis clinic has 38 beds. When in full capacity, it will receive 30,000 patients and treat 8,000 emergency patients per day. The hospital serves in cardiac surgery, neurology, oncology, orthopedic surgery, physical treatment & rehabilitation and general branches. It is one of the nine city hospitals and the biggest in the country. The hospital campus features also a 100-bed hotel as medical observation clinic. The campus features two helipads for landing of ambulance helicopters carrying airlifted patients.

About 2,700 academicians, physicians and surgeons, 6,300 health care personnel and 4,000 administrative and support personnel are employed in the hospital.

See also
Başakşehir Çam and Sakura City Hospital, Istanbul
Ankara Etlik City Hospital, Ankara

References

Hospitals in Ankara
Hospitals established in 2019
2019 establishments in Turkey
Çankaya, Ankara
Government-owned hospitals in Turkey